Allika is a village in Hiiumaa Parish, Hiiu County in northwestern Estonia.

The village is first mentioned in 1620 (Hallikio by).

In 1970s the village was divided into two: western part as Allika I village, and eastern part as Allika II village. In 1977, Allika I was merged into Moka village, and Allika II into Vaku (former) village. In 1997, the pre-1970s situation was restored.

References
 

Villages in Hiiu County